Brazil has participated in all the World Aquatics Championships since the beginning in 1973. Brazil is 14th on the all time medal table. Brazil's first World Championships medal was won by Rômulo Arantes in the Men's 100 m backstroke in West Berlin in 1978. He won bronze.  Ricardo Prado won the first Brazil's gold medal in Men's 400 m individual medley in Guayaquil, Ecuador in 1982. Poliana Okimoto was the first woman to win a medal , a bronze in women's 5 km in Rome in 2009. Ana Marcela Cunha was the first woman to win a gold medal in women's 25 km in Shanghai in 2011.

Medalists

Swimming

Open water swimming

Medal tables

By championships

By event

By gender

By athlete

Only athletes with at least three medals

Best Finishes

Swimming

Open water swimming

See also
 Brazil at the FINA World Swimming Championships (25 m)
 Brazil at the Olympics
 Brazil at the Pan American Games

References

 
Nations at the World Aquatics Championships